Yaroun (also spelled Yarun) is a Lebanese village located in the Caza of Bint Jbeil in the Nabatieh Governorate in Lebanon.

Geography
Yaroun occupies a hill with elevation ranging from 750 to 900 meters above sea level.  The main agricultural products of Yaroun are olives, wheat, and tobacco.

Yaroun lies on the Israeli-Lebanese border. It overlooks Yir'on and Avivim in Israel.

History

Antiquity 

Ottoman period 
In 1596, it was named as a village, يارون النصارى (Yarun an-Nasara meaning “Yarun of the Christians”) in the Ottoman nahiya (subdistrict) of  Tibnin  under the liwa' (district) of Safad, with a population of 37 Muslim households and 20 Muslim bachelors, and  39 Christian households and 11 Christian bachelors. The villagers paid taxes on a number of crops, such as wheat, barley, olive trees, vineyards, fruit trees,  goats and beehives, in addition to "occasional revenues"; a total of 7,247 akçe.

In 1674, western travelers saw remains of a monastery and church near by, with fragments from many columns.

In 1781 Nasif al-Nassar was killed here by Jazzar Pasha when their two armies met.

In 1838, Edward Robinson noted it as "a large village". Ernest Renan visited Yaroun during his mission to Lebanon and described what he found in his book Mission de Phénicie (1865-1874).  He found many antiquities at Yaroun.

On 31 December 1863, Louis Félicien de Saulcy, the French orientalist and archaeologist left Jish and arrived in Yaroun, and despite the heavy rain on that day, he examined the ruins of a temple, with a huge sarcophagi and sepulchral excavations cut into the rock, and a square well few meters deep, deducing that Yaroun was the Biblical town of Iaraoun, one of the cities of the Naphtali tribe mentioned in the Book of Joshua (xiv. 38).

According to Victor Guérin, who visited in 1870, the town had 300 Greek Orthodox Christians and 200 Shia Muslims. He described the local church, devoted to St. George ("Mar Jiris") as simple and modest, and pointed out a Greek inscription and a decoration of a date tree in the local mosque, which, according to the inscription, were once part of a nearby temple.

In 1881, the PEF's Survey of Western Palestine (SWP)  described it: “A stone village, containing about 200 Metawileh and 200 Christians ; a Christian chapel in the village.

SWP also found here the remains of an ancient Church, with Greek inscriptions.

Lebanon 
By the 1945 statistics the population was counted with Saliha and Maroun al-Ras, to a total of 1070 Muslims with 11,735 dunams of land, according to an official land and population survey. Of this, 7,401 dunams were allocated to cereals, 422 dunams were irrigated or used for orchards, while  58 dunams were built-up (urban) area.

In July 2006, Yaroun, like many other villages that string Lebanon's southern border, such as Ain Ebel, Debel, Qaouzah, and Rmaich, were caught by the 2006 Lebanon War between Hezbollah and the Israeli Defense Forces. On the 23 July, 5 civilians were killed in an Israeli strike in Yaroun; victims were aged between 6 months and 75 years old.

Religion
Yaroun is divided between Shia Muslims and Catholic Christians.

In 2009, there were 365 members of the Saint-Georges parish of the Melkite Church in the village.

Social life
While the majority of Yarounis visit Yaroun for the summer, approximately 60% to 70% of Yaroun natives reside outside of Lebanon, and include countries such as Australia, USA, Argentina, Brazil, Colombia, Panama, Venezuela, and South Africa. Due to the devastation of the Israeli occupancy, and various wars in the last 40 years, economic development has been slow in the area, resulting in younger generation Yarounis to seek higher education opportunities in other countries.  However, during the summer, many families return to the region, and spend time with families left behind.

Notable persons
Eid Hourany (1940 – 2008), French and Lebanese nuclear physicist
Youssef Hourany (1931 – 2019), Lebanese writer, archeologist and historian
Dominique Hourani (born 1985), Lebanese recording artist, actress, beauty queen, and former model
Mohamad Kdouh (born 1997), Lebanese footballer

References

Bibliography

External links
Survey of Western Palestine, Map 4: IAA, Wikimedia commons
Yaroun, Localiban

Populated places in the Israeli security zone 1985–2000
Populated places in Bint Jbeil District